Leonor Rivera-Kipping (née Rivera y Bauzon; 11 April 1867 – 28 August 1893) was the childhood sweetheart, and “lover by correspondence” of Philippine national hero José Rizal.  Rivera was the “greatest influence” in preventing Rizal from falling in love with other women while Rizal was traveling outside the Philippines.  Rivera's romantic relationship with Rizal lasted for eight years.  She was immortalized by Rizal as the character María Clara in the Spanish-language novel Noli Me Tangere. Her original hometown is in Camiling, Tarlac.

Description
Born as Leonor Bauson Rivera, a native of Camiling, Tarlac, was the daughter of Antonio Rivera and Silvestra Bauzon. Her father (whom Rizal calls "Uncle Antonio" in his letters) is a cousin of Rizal's father, Francisco Mercado.  Austin Coates, Rizal's European biographer, described Rivera in Rizal: Philippine Nationalist and Martyr as a “pretty woman” whose physical features included having a “high forehead”, “soft and wavy hair”, a face that sported “almond eyes”, “small and pensive mouth”,  and “engaging dimples”.  Furthermore, Rivera was a talented, mature, and intelligent lady who played the piano and was gifted with a “charming singing voice”.  Rivera studied at La Concordia College in Manila.

Family background

Rivera's family resided in Dagupan from 1890 to 1891, when the railroad line between Manila and Dagupan was being constructed.  Her parents had a clothing merchandise business there.  The Riveras first lived on Torres Bugallon Avenue in a property belonging to Don Alejandro Venteres and Doña Rosario Laurel Villamil, a couple closely connected to the family.  The family later moved to a house belonging to Don Andres Palaganas, a person related to Don Venteres by affinity.  The son of Don Palaganas, Ciriaco (a former Dagupan municipal president), was the husband of Don Venteres's relative Paula Venteres.  The second residence of the Riveras was located at a place presently known as Rivera Street.

Relationship with Rizal

Leonor Rivera and Rizal first met in Manila when Rivera was only 14 years old. When Rizal left for Europe on May 3, 1882, Rivera was 15 years of age. Their ensuing correspondence began when Rizal left a poem for Rivera saying farewell, and their letters to each other slowly became romantic in nature. The correspondence between Rivera and Rizal kept Rizal focused on his studies in Europe. They employed codes in their letters because Rivera's mother did not favour Rizal as a suitor for her daughter. A letter from Mariano Catigbac dated June 27, 1884 referred to Rivera as Rizal's “betrothed”. Catigbac described Rivera as having been greatly affected by Rizal's departure, frequently sick because of insomnia.

When Rizal returned to the Philippines on August 5, 1887, Rivera was no longer living in Intramuros because she and her family had moved back to Dagupan, Pangasinan. Rizal wanted to meet Rivera and vice versa, but both were prohibited by their respective fathers; Francisco Mercado barred his son from meeting her in order to avoid putting the Rivera family in danger, as Rizal had by then been labeled a filibustero or subversive by the Spanish colonial government because of his novel, Noli Me Tangere.  Rizal wanted to marry Rivera while he was still in the Philippines because of her uncomplaining fidelity, so they asked permission from his father one more time before his second departure. The meeting never happened.

In 1888, Rizal stopped receiving letters from Rivera for a year, even as he kept sending letters to her. The reason for Rivera's silence was the connivance between Rivera's mother and an Englishman named Henry Charles Kipping, a railway engineer who fell in love with Rivera and was favoured by Rivera's mother.

Marriage to Kipping

Rivera met Kipping at the house of Doña Carmen Villamil, who was a former classmate of hers at La Concordia College. Kipping was associated with the engineer Crisostomo Villamil, who supervised the Manila-Dagupan railroad line project at the time. Rivera and Kipping were married on June 17, 1890 in Dagupan. Their first child was Carlos Rivera Kipping Sr., who married Lourdes Rómulo.

Death
Rivera died on 28 August 1893 shortly after giving birth to her second child with Kipping. Shortly before she died, her last wish was to have the silver box containing the ashes of Rizal's burned letters be buried with her.

Media portrayals
 Portrayed by Mickey Ferriols in the film, Jose Rizal (1998).
 Portrayed by Kylie Padilla in the TV series, Ilustrado (2014).

See also
Josephine Bracken

References

External links
Sketch of Leonor Rivera by José Rizal and Leonor Rivera’s photograph at tagaloglang.com
Leonor Rivera-Kipping House at Camiling, Tarlac, Philippines at flickr.com

1867 births
1893 deaths
People from Tarlac
People from Dagupan
19th-century Filipino women
Deaths in childbirth